Lagunitas Formation may refer to:
 Lagunitas Formation, Cuba, an Early Miocene geologic formation of Cuba
 Lagunitas Formation, Colombia, a Cretaceous geologic formation of Colombia
 Lagunitas Sandstone, a member of the Bartonian Verdun Formation of Peru